The Habeas Corpus Suspension Acts of 1688 were three Acts of the Parliament of England (1 Will. & Mar. cc. 2, 7 & 19) which temporarily suspended the right of habeas corpus in England until 17 April, 25 May and 23 October 1689 respectively. They were passed in the wake of the Glorious Revolution, in which King James II had recently been deposed.

The three Acts were very similar. They each provided that any six members of the Privy Council could sign a warrant committing to prison anyone they suspected of high treason, without bail, mainprise or trial, until the date the Act expired or unless six privy counsellors signed an order permitting their bail or trial. The Acts did not allow the imprisonment of any member of either House of Parliament, unless the House that member belonged to first gave its consent to his imprisonment.

References

See also
Habeas Corpus Suspension Act
Jacobitism
High treason in the United Kingdom

1688 in law
1688 in England
Treason in England
Acts of the Parliament of England
Glorious Revolution
Habeas corpus